Abu Tashufin I (Arabic : أبو تاشفين ابن أبو حمو موسى الأول; Abu Tashufin Abd al Rahman Ibn Abu Musa Al-awal), was the 5th Sultan of the Zayyanid dynasty ruling the Kingdom of Tlemcen, in medieval Algeria.

He was the son of Abu Hammu I, the preceding Sultan of Tlemcen.
He overthrown his father
 and led the conquest of Ifriqiya expanding in the east making the Great Mosque of Algiers Zayyanid also in the capture of tunis the hafsid capital and he had to face the alliance between Marinids and Hafsids by a mariage of hafsid princess with Abu al Hassan Sultan of Marinids which led to his death during the siege of tlemcen from 1335-1337. 
Tlemcen was conquered by Abu al-Hasan Ali ibn Othman of the Marinid dynasty from 1337 until 1348, when it was retaken by Abu Tashufin's sons, Abu Said Uthman and Abu Thabit.

See also

References

Berber rulers
Zayyanid dynasty
Year of birth missing
Year of death missing
14th-century Berber people
14th-century monarchs in Africa